Pennsylvania Route 331 (PA 331) is a , east–west state highway located in Washington County, Pennsylvania.  The western terminus is at the West Virginia state line in Independence Township where the road continues as West Virginia Route 67 (WV 67).  The eastern terminus is at PA 844 in Canton Township. PA 331 was initially established on May 27, 1935. The route was rerouted in the 2000s following the closure of a bridge over Buffalo Creek.

Route description

PA 331 begins at the West Virginia state border, at the eastern terminus of WV 67.  The route heads east in Independence Township paralleling Buffalo Creek. After , the route makes a left turn onto Mount Hope Ridge Road. PA 231 meets PA 331 in the community of Mount Hope and together head south towards the community of Acheson. After turning east, PA 231 exits the concurrency and PA 331 alone heads east following the course of Brush Run. After passing through the southernmost portion of Hopewell Township, it reaches its eastern terminus at PA 844 in Canton Township.

History
The route was established on May 27, 1935 on much of the same alignment it runs today. Prior to 2005, PA 331 followed a more direct route between the state line and Acheson by following Buffalo Creek in Independence and Donegal Townships. On August 30, 2005, the Pennsylvania Department of Transportation (PennDOT) closed and later removed one of the bridges over Buffalo Creek due to safety concerns. By 2007, PA 331 was routed onto then-SR 4065 (Mount Hope Ridge Road) and PA 231 and the decommissioned sections of PA 331 became SR 3001, SR 4034, and SR 4036.

Major intersections

PA 331 Truck

Pennsylvania Route 331 Truck is a truck route bypassing a weight-restricted bridge over a branch over Brush Run on which trucks over 36 tons and combination loads over 40 tons are prohibited. The route follows PA 231 and PA 844 through Washington County, Pennsylvania.  PA 331 Truck was signed in 2013.

See also

References

External links

Pennsylvania Highways: PA 331

331
Transportation in Washington County, Pennsylvania